Bergeri may refer to:

 Homopus bergeri, the Berger's cape tortoise, a species of turtle endemic to Namibia
 Hyalinobatrachium bergeri, a species of frog found in Bolivia and Peru
 Italian pool frog (Pelophylax bergeri), a species of frog found in France and Italy
 Tillandsia bergeri, a species of the genus Tillandsia native to Brazil

See also
 Berger (disambiguation)